Collagen alpha-4(IV) chain is a protein that in humans is encoded by the COL4A4 gene.

This gene encodes one of the six subunits of type IV collagen, the major structural component of basement membranes. This particular collagen IV subunit, however, is only found in a subset of basement membranes. Like the other members of the type IV collagen gene family, this gene is organized in a head-to-head conformation with another type IV collagen gene so that each gene pair shares a common promoter. Mutations in this gene are associated with type II autosomal recessive Alport syndrome (hereditary glomerulonephropathy) and with familial benign hematuria (thin basement membrane disease). Two transcripts, differing only in their transcription start sites, have been identified for this gene and, as is common for collagen genes, multiple polyadenylation sites are found in the 3' UTR.

Disease Database
LOVD Alport gene variant databases (COL4A4, COL4A3, COL4A5)

References

Further reading

Collagens